Brandon del Pozo, PhD, MPA, MA (born 1974) is an assistant professor of Medicine and Health Services, Policy and Practice (Research) at the Warren Alpert Medical School of Brown University, and a research scientist at Rhode Island Hospital. He is also a faculty member of the Master of Science Program in Addiction Policy and Practice at the Georgetown University's Graduate School of Arts and Sciences.  

Prior to research, del Pozo was the chief of police of Burlington, Vermont for four years, and served with the New York City Police Department for nearly two decades, rising to the rank of deputy inspector. While there, he commanded the 6th and 50th Precincts, and served overseas as an intelligence officer for the Arab world and India (based in Amman, Jordan). There, he investigated terror attacks to see what lessons they offered for New York City. He has received national recognition for his innovation and reform.

Early life and education
Born in the Bensonhurst neighborhood of the New York borough of Brooklyn to a Cuban father and Jewish mother, del Pozo graduated from Stuyvesant High School in New York, then completed a bachelor's degree from Dartmouth College.

Del Pozo earned a master's degree in public administration from the John F. Kennedy School of Government at Harvard University, and a master of arts in Criminal Justice from John Jay College. While at the Kennedy School, he was a 9/11 Public Service Fellow, in recognition of the sacrifices made by first responders on that day.

He holds a PhD in Philosophy and the enroute MPhil from The Graduate School and University Center of the City University of New York. To expand his research from political philosophy to public health, he trained as a NIDA-funded postdoctoral researcher in drug policy and substance use at the Miriam Hospital and the Warren Alpert Medical School of Brown University, where he went on to receive a faculty appointment.

Research career 
Dr. del Pozo has been funded by the National Institutes of Health to investigate how public systems, policies, and law, especially relating to criminal justice, affect the health and safety of individuals and communities. He also conducts research on the normative commitments of government, especially police. Some of his research that has gained mainstream attention has compared the risks of violence faced by military-aged males in selected US cities with the wartime risks of injury and death faced by soldiers deployed to combat in Iraq and Afghanistan, and efforts to dispel the myth that police officers can quickly overdose and die from touching the synthetic opioid fentanyl.

In 2022, Cambridge University Press published del Pozo's book The Police and the State: Security, Social Cooperation, and the Public Good.  It uses modern political philosophy to present an account of the role of police in a pluralist democracy, attempting to reconcile  the work of Hegel, John Rawls, Elizabeth Anderson, and Charles Mills, who sat on his dissertation committee.

Police career 
Citing the challenges of policing in the United States, del Pozo came to Burlington with a desire to improve police services in the city as a model for progress in the profession. His appointment was contested by some locals due to his prior work with the New York Police Department (NYPD), but his nomination was unanimously approved by the Burlington City Council.

Opioid addiction and overdose reduction
The mayor of Burlington directed del Pozo to create and implement a strategy for addressing its effects that focuses on public health rather than law enforcement and uses data and collaboration as cornerstones of the approach. Shortly after taking on the leadership of the Burlington Police Department, del Pozo began a wide-ranging initiative. He directed all patrol officers to carry Naloxone, and assisted the mayor's office with the creation of the city's Opioid Policy Coordinator position, as well as staffing his office with analysts with graduate training in epidemiology and biostatistics. Based out of the police department, the two positions vet police work for better public health outcomes and assist the city in formulating policies, directives and public engagements to reduce the morbidity and mortality associated with opioid abuse.

Del Pozo's insights into the need for swift action in treating addiction and overdose gained national attention. He has been vocal about the need for all people suffering from opioid addiction to have prompt access to the medications proven to treat it, including prisoners, and he adopted a policy where his department would not arrest people for unprescribed possession of buprenorphine. In early 2020, the city of Philadelphia took the same position towards buprenorphine, citing Burlington's leadership on the issue.

In 2018, as the rest of Vermont saw a 20% increase in opioid overdose deaths, Burlington's county saw a 50% decline in these deaths, to their lowest levels since 2013, when the state began keeping records. The reduction was sustained through the end of 2019. Del Pozo served on the board of trustees of the Howard Center, Vermont's largest addiction and mental health service provider.

Deescalation
In the winter of 2016, after a Burlington police officer killed Phil Grenon, a man who attacked the police with knives at the end of a prolonged standoff, del Pozo began a program to improve outcomes in the use of force, piloting the Police Executive Research Forum's (PERF) new force guidelines and curriculum to avert physical confrontations while maintaining officer safety. The Reveal, a show syndicated by American Public Media, produced a segment taking a close look at the incident and its aftermath: "When Tasers Fail."

In 2018, del Pozo gave the highest award in the department to an officer who was in the path of a robbery suspect fleeing in a vehicle and would have been justified in opening fire on the vehicle, but chose not to, saying that restraint was a valuable quality in a police officer. He also investigated the Vermont State Police Academy for allegations that officers were needlessly being struck unexpectedly in the head during training scenarios, causing a pattern of concussions. As a result, the academy settled a suit with one of the injured students and ceased delivering unexpected blows to the heads of its recruits.

Transparency
An advocate for greater transparency in policing and government, del Pozo created a police data transparency portal featuring a quote by legal philosopher Jeremy Waldron: "In a democracy, the accountable agents of the people owe the people an account of what they have been doing, and a refusal to provide this is simple insolence." He has spoken at the Obama White House to an audience of police leaders on the value of the practice as part of efforts to implement the recommendations of the President's Task Force on 21st Century Policing. During his tenure, the police department has made concerted efforts to diversify its rank and file, with moderate success.

Overseas intelligence 
In 2005, citing intelligence failures that led to the 9/11 terror attacks, the NYPD selected del Pozo to create and staff its first intelligence liaison post with the Arab world, based out of Amman, Jordan. Embedded with the Jordanian National Police, he responded to suicide bombings at Jordanian hotels planned and executed by Abu Musab al-Zarqawi, and an attack on a Roman amphitheater. He also responded to two attacks in Mumbai, India: a 2006 bombing of seven trains on the city's commuter rail, and the 2008 Lashkar-e-Taiba-led attack on downtown Mumbai itself, where a team of gunmen attacked hotels, transportation hubs, tourist areas and a Jewish cultural center. Del Pozo reported his analyses back to the NYPD and other agencies, assessing how these attacks could be replicated by exploiting security vulnerabilities in New York City, and what measures could be taken to prevent them. His role was unique in that there was no other US intelligence officer conducting work on behalf of a municipal police department in either region.

Recognition 
In May 2016, the PERF awarded del Pozo its Gary Hayes Memorial Award for his innovation and leadership. He is also an executive fellow at the Washington, D.C.-based National Policing Institute, a "national, independent non-profit organization dedicated to advancing policing through innovation and science."

Resignation
Del Pozo resigned as chief on December 16, 2019, after disclosing that he had used an anonymous Twitter account to tweet at a critic of the city for an hour about the person's criticism of outdoor dining, the city's AmeriCorps program, and the renovation of public parks. He told The New York Times that the incident "taught me that nothing good ever comes from letting social media criticism get under your skin."

Bicycle accident 
In 2018, while training for his second Lake Placid Ironman 70.3, del Pozo suffered multiple serious injuries in a bicycle accident, including three skull fractures, brain hemorrhaging, a partially collapsed lung, and seven other broken bones. He was transported by emergency airlift to an intensive care unit at the UVM Medical Center. After eight weeks of convalescence, he returned to full duty in his role. Citing concussion symptoms, del Pozo took a second medical leave in the summer of 2019.

Personal life 
Del Pozo married Sarah Carnevale in 2002. He wrote and directed a narrative short film, Sunday 1287, which screened at the Middlebury and Vermont International Film Festivals. The film was based on a crime he investigated while commanding a precinct in the New York borough of the Bronx. An outdoors enthusiast, he has climbed New Hampshire's 48 highest mountains, completed the Lake Placid Half Ironman and other triathlons, and written for publications about cycling and climbing.

References

Harvard Kennedy School alumni
1974 births
American municipal police chiefs
Living people
People from Bensonhurst, Brooklyn
Dartmouth College alumni
Stuyvesant High School alumni
John Jay College of Criminal Justice alumni
Graduate Center, CUNY alumni